This list includes properties and districts listed on the National Register of Historic Places in Alamance County, North Carolina. Click the "Map of all coordinates" link to the right to view an online map of all properties and districts with latitude and longitude coordinates in the table below.

Current listings

|}

See also

 National Register of Historic Places listings in North Carolina
 List of National Historic Landmarks in North Carolina

References

Alamance County, North Carolina
Alamance County
Buildings and structures in Alamance County, North Carolina